Fatma Naime Sultan ("who one abstain" and "tranquil"; 5 September 1876 –  1945) was an Ottoman princess, the daughter of Sultan Abdul Hamid II and Bidar Kadın.

Early life

Naime Sultan was born on 5 September 1876 in the Dolmabahçe Palace, four days after her father's accession to the throne. Her father was Abdul Hamid II, son of Abdulmejid I and Tirimüjgan Kadın. Her mother was Bidar Kadın, a Circassian. She was the fourth child, and third daughter of her father and the eldest child of her mother. She had one brother, Şehzade Mehmed Abdülkadir, two years younger than her. 

Abdul Hamid called her "My accession daughter", because she was born four days after his accession to the throne. With her half-sisters Zekiye Sultan and Ayşe Sultan, she was one of Abdülhamid's favorite daughters. She was named after her late aunt, the first and only daughter of Tirimüjgan, and elder sister of her father. Naime Sultan had green eyes, as her paternal grandmother, Tirimüjgan Kadın. In 1877, Naime and other members of the imperial family settled in the Yıldız Palace, after Abdul Hamid moved there on 7 April 1877.

Naime took French and painting classes as a young child. She also liked playing the piano. She had learnt playing it from François Lombardi, along with her younger half-sister Ayşe Sultan. When the German empress Augusta Victoria of Schleswig-Holstein, visited Istanbul, Naime entertained her by playing German music on her piano.

Abbas Hilmi Pasha, the khedive of Egypt asked Naime Sultan's hand in marriage. However, Abdul Hamid did not approved this marriage on the basis of political reasons and offered instead an his lady of court. Her father decided that she would marry Şehzade Mehmed Ziyaeddin, the son of Mehmed V, Abdul Hamid's brother. However it wasn't accepted by Mehmed Reşad, and as a result the marriage did not take place (curiously, Naime's son will later marry Ziyaeddin's daughter).

First marriage
In 1898, Abdul Hamid arranged Naime's marriage to Mehmed Kemaleddin Bey, younger son of Gazi Osman Pasha, whose eldest son Nureddin Pasha was husband of her elder sister, Princess Zekiye Sultan. A mansion was built for her in Ortaköy next to the household of princess Zekiye, so that the two buildings used to be called "The Twin Mansions."

The marriage took place on 17 March 1898 in the Ortaköy Palace. Gazi Osman Pasha sent Princess Naime a tiara, while Abdul Hamid presented her new mother-in-law with the Order of Abdulmejid. No minister's wife had ever received this order. Later on Kemaleddin Bey was made a pasha.

Naime Sultan's dress was white as she wanted to give a European wedding reflect. Quite a few old-fashioned persons criticized the fact that her dress was white, because until that time all princesses had worn red at their weddings. But at Naime's wish and insistence, hers was white.

The marriage was descrived by Ayşe Sultan, a Naime half-sisters, in her memories:
When her husband entered the salon in the harem where his bride was seated, he ceremoniously asked her to rise but the princess refused (as was custom). The groom begged her and started to sweat, but Naime Sultan refused for at least half an hour. At that, the Valide Sultan was called and said to her: “My dear girl, for my sake please rise. Don’t hurt our son-in-law’s feelings.” Naime Sultan finally rose, and cries of Maşallah were heard while the Hamidiye March was played. Kemaleddin Paşa and the Constable of the Maidens escorted her with difficulty to the bridal room, because the stairway was crowded with guests and Naime Sultan’s dress was particularly heavy. She seated in the corner set up for her inside the bridal room, then the groom exited and tossed golden coins around. Then it was the Sultan’s golden coins turn, then the Valide Sultan’s, then the Senior Kalfas of the elder princesses began to scatter golden coins to the ground floor, each of them shouting the name of her mistress.
Afterwards, the female members of the Imperial Family entered the room of the bride and kissed her hand to congratulate her. Then the banquet began and lasted until evening, when the guests began to leave. The groom kissed the hand of the Valide Sultan.
At the time of the nighttime prayer, Kemaleddin Paşa was once again escorted by the Constable of the Maidens to the room of his wife. Before entering, he kissed the hands of the Valide Sultan and of the princesses one last time. Inside the room, he performed his prayers on a prayer rug embroidered with golden threads, while Naile Sultan stood watching him.
Prayers done, the Constable of the Maidens closed the room door, performed a floor temenna (salutation) and prayed that the marriage would be blessed by God.

The two together had a son, Sultanzade Mehmed Cahid Bey, born in January 1899, and a daughter, Adile Hanımsultan, born on 12 November 1900. Mehmed Cahid married Dürriye Sultan, a daughter of Şehzade Mehmed Ziyaeddin.  Adile married Şehzade Mahmud Şevket, a son of Şehzade Mehmed Seyfeddin, and grandson son of Abdulaziz and Gevheri Kadın

Kemaleddin's affair and divorce
Hatice Sultan, daughter of Sultan Murad V, her neighbour in the adjoining villa, had been having an affair for three years, between 1901 and 1904, with her husband, Kemaleddin Pasha. According to Filizten Hanım, the two decided to have Naime murdered so they could get married. At that time of discovery, Naime Sultan was ill. The shock of discovering that the husband she loved was cheating on her with her cousin further weakened her and she did not recover for some time, and this reinforced the rumors that the two lovers had poisoned her. However, Naime's medicines, cosmetics, drinks and food were analyzed and found no poison.

Many of the sources reveal the same idea about how this love between Kemaleddin Pasha and Hatice Sultan emerged.  According to this idea, this love story consists of a trap set by Hatice Sultan. Thus, she want to take revenge from Sultan Abdul Hamid, who has imprisoned her father in Çırağan Palace for years, left her single until the age of thirty and caused her to marry someone she never loved.  The perfect way to take revenge was to ruin the marriage of Sultan favourite's daughter.

However, Semih Mümtaz, whose father, the Governor of Bursa, was charged with guarding Kemaleddin Pasha in his internal exile, mentions nothing whatsoever about a plot to poison Naime, but rather claims that the affair between Hatice Sultan and Kemaleddin Pasha consisted of the exchange of love letters tossed over the garden wall, heated love letters on the part of the impulsive Kemaleddin Pasha. He claims that Hatice Sultan had the Pasha's letters stolen and revealed to Sultan Abdul Hamid on purpose, in revenge for the poor husband the Sultan had chosen for her.

The resulting scandal angered Abdul Hamid. First he had Naime Sultan divorce her husband. Then he stripped Kemaleddin Pasha of all his military honors and exiled him to Bursa. Hatice's father, Murad, was a diabetic and when he heard of the affair, the shock of his distress brought on his death a short time later.

Second marriage

Following her divorce from Kemaleddin Pasha in 1904, Naime married İşkodralı Celaleddin Pasha, son of İşkodralızâde Ali Riza Paşa and descendant by a daughter of Sultan Mahmud II, on 11 July 1907 at Yıldız Palace. He was promoted vizir for occasion.  As it was Naime Sultan’s second marriage, celebrations weren’t held, only the official ceremony (nikkah). Though the marriage was childless, it was said to have been peaceful and friendly. 

Starting late in 1920, the then Ankara government organized two intelligence organizations based in Istanbul, the Müdafaa-i Milliye Grubu (Mim Mim group, National Defense Group), which brought together the remnants of the Karakol or Teşkilatı group which had been effectively suppressed by the second British occupation of the Ottoman capital, and the Felah group which was an entirely new and separate oranganization, established to keep and eye on the former Unionists as to smuggle arms, people, and to gather information. Naime and her cousin, Fehime Sultan, daughter of Sultan Murad V were active members of the organization.

In March 1924, all the members of the Ottoman dynasty were expelled from Turkey; according to her son-in-law, Naime Sultan and Celâleddîn Paşa first went to Albania (Celâleddîn Paşa’s homeland), and then settled in France, where he caught tuberculosis. The princess spent all the money she had to save him but his conditions were serious and he died right before the Nazi invasion of France in 1940. Soon afterwards, Naime Sultan left France to return to Albania, where she settled with her granddaughter Nermin Sultan and a couple of female servants.

Exile and Death
At the exile of imperial family in March 1924, Naime along with her husband and granddaughter Nermin Sultan settled in Genoa, where her husband had rented a hotel. They later settled in Nice, France. Her son also settled in Nice with her. In exile, she taught Turkish and told stories about the lavish life of the palace to her grandson, Bülent Osman. Her husband died in 1940. Following the Italian occupation of France in 1940, Naime Sultan left France, along with her granddaughter Nermin Sultan and settled in Tirana, Albania. 

Following the death of her husband, she fell into poverty. 
According to her grandson, she died due to bombing on her house in 1945 in the middle of World War II. Another source revealed that Naime died in a Nazi concentration camp in Albania. This proved be to true as Şehzade Mahmud Şevket had found his daughter Nermin, in a concentration camp as she lived with Naime. She was buried in Tirana, Albania.

Character
According to her younger sister Ayşe Sultan, Naime Sultan resembled her grandmother Tirimüjgan Kadın. She was really delicate, sweet, and kind hearted. She arranged the marriages of orphaned Circassian girls in her entourage. Naime adored music, she had several musicians in her palace, who played the saz. She also had an interest in poetry and art.

Honours

 Order of the House of Osman
 Order of the Medjidie, Jeweled
 Iftikhar Sanayi Medal in Gold

Issue

In popular culture
 In the 2017 TV series Payitaht: Abdülhamid, Naime Sultan is portrayed by Turkish actress Duygu Gurcan.

Ancestry

See also
 List of Ottoman princesses

References

Sources
 

 
 

1876 births
1945 deaths
Royalty from Istanbul
19th-century Ottoman princesses
20th-century Ottoman princesses
Civilians killed in World War II
People who died in Nazi concentration camps
20th-century spies